Tashtagol (Taştaƣol) is a town in Kemerovo Oblast, Russia, located on the Kondoma River  south of Kemerovo, the administrative center of the oblast.

History
It was founded in 1939 as a mining settlement and was granted town status in 1963.

Administrative and municipal status
Within the framework of administrative divisions, Tashtagol serves as the administrative center of Tashtagolsky District, even though is not a part of it. As an administrative division, it is incorporated separately as Tashtagol Town Under Oblast Jurisdiction—an administrative unit with a status equal to that of the districts. As a municipal division, Tashtagol Town Under Oblast Jurisdiction is incorporated within Tashtagolsky Municipal District as Tashtagolskoye Urban Settlement.

Population
Population:

References

Notes

Sources

Cities and towns in Kemerovo Oblast
Populated places established in 1939
Cities and towns built in the Soviet Union
1939 establishments in the Soviet Union
Monotowns in Russia